Sebastian Kuntschik (born 23 September 1988) is an Austrian sports shooter. He competed in the men's skeet event at the 2016 Summer Olympics.

References

External links
 

1988 births
Living people
Austrian male sport shooters
Olympic shooters of Austria
Shooters at the 2016 Summer Olympics
Place of birth missing (living people)
European Games competitors for Austria
Shooters at the 2015 European Games
21st-century Austrian people